Mecasermin, sold under the brand name Increlex, also known as recombinant human insulin-like growth factor-1 (rhIGF-1), is a recombinant form of human insulin-like growth factor 1 (IGF-I) which is used in the long-term treatment of growth failure and short stature in children with severe primary IGF-I deficiency, for instance due to growth hormone deficiency or Laron syndrome (growth hormone insensitivity).

Mecasermin has a biological half-life of about 5.8 hours in children with severe primary IGF-1 deficiency.

A related medication is mecasermin rinfabate (brand name Iplex), which is a combination of mecasermin (rhIGF-1), insulin-like growth factor binding protein-3 (IGFBP-3), and insulin-like growth factor binding protein acid labile subunit (IGFALS) as a ternary complex. The complex serves to prolong the action of mecasermin in the human body; the half-life of mecasermin when provided as this complex is 13.4 hours in individuals with severe primary IGF-1 deficiency.

References

External links 
 

Endocrinology
Growth hormones
Insulin-like growth factor receptor agonists
Insulin receptor agonists
Peptides